Muhamed Khodavand (born 7 March 1950) is a former Iranian cyclist. He competed in the team time trial and team pursuit events at the 1972 Summer Olympics.

References

External links
 

1950 births
Living people
Iranian male cyclists
Olympic cyclists of Iran
Cyclists at the 1972 Summer Olympics
Place of birth missing (living people)
20th-century Iranian people